The Pennsylvania Attorney General election of 2020 was held on November 3, 2020. Primary elections were originally due to take place on April 28, 2020. However, following concerns regarding the COVID-19 pandemic in the United States including Pennsylvania, the primaries were delayed until June 2, 2020. Incumbent Democratic attorney general Josh Shapiro defeated Republican Heather Heidelbaugh to win a second term. With this victory, earning 3,461,472 votes and outperforming Joe Biden in the concurrent presidential election, Shapiro became the highest votegetter in Pennsylvania history.

Democratic primary

Candidates

Declared
 Josh Shapiro, incumbent Pennsylvania Attorney General

Results

Republican primary

Candidates

Declared
 Heather Heidelbaugh, former Allegheny County councilwoman

Results

General election

Predictions

Polling

Endorsements

Results

See also
 2020 Pennsylvania elections

Notes

Partisan clients

References

External links 
Official campaign websites
 Josh Shapiro (D) for Attorney General
  Heather Heidelbaugh (R) for Attorney General

Attorney General
Pennsylvania Attorney General elections
Pennsylvania
Josh Shapiro